Scybalistodes periculosalis is a moth in the family Crambidae. It was described by Harrison Gray Dyar Jr. in 1908. It has been recorded from the US state of California.

References

Moths described in 1908
Glaphyriinae